Dira is a genus of butterflies from the subfamily Satyrinae in the family Nymphalidae.

Species
Dira clytus (Linnaeus, 1764)
Dira jansei (Swierstra, 1911)
Dira oxylus (Trimen, 1881)
Dira swanepoeli (van Son, 1939)

External links 
 "Dira Hübner, [1819]" at Markku Savela's Lepidoptera and Some Other Life Forms

Satyrini
Butterfly genera
Taxa named by Jacob Hübner